"Wrong Night" is a song written by Josh Leo and Rick Bowles, and recorded by American country music artist Reba McEntire. It was released on October 23, 1998 as the third single from her album If You See Him.  The song reached #6 on the Billboard Hot Country Singles & Tracks chart in February 1999.

Chart performance

Year-end charts

References

1998 singles
Reba McEntire songs
Songs written by Josh Leo
Song recordings produced by David Malloy
MCA Nashville Records singles
Songs written by Rick Bowles
1998 songs